Bernard Gérard (26 April 1930 – 29 June 2000) was a French composer of film scores. He was one of Michel Magne's principal orchestrators, and worked as well with Georges Lautner and Jean-Pierre Melville.

1930 births
2000 deaths
French film score composers
French male film score composers
Eurovision Song Contest conductors
20th-century conductors (music)
20th-century French composers
20th-century French male musicians